Shuanglong Cave is a water-filled karst cave some  from Jinhua City, Zhejiang Province, People's Republic of China.

Description

Formed around 100 million years ago, the entrance is flanked on both sides by stalactites that resemble dragon heads (龙头/龍头, lóng tóu), hence the Chinese name for the cave.

Shuanglong Cave provides access to the adjacent Binghu Cave via a series of stone steps.

The surrounding Shuanglong Scenic Area (双龙风景名胜区), covering , is a 4A rated national tourist attraction. It contains other karst caves including the Taoyuan Cave (桃源洞), Chaozhen Cave (朝真洞) and Bingbao Cave (冰瀑洞) as  well as the following sub-areas:

 Huangdaxian Scenic Area (黄大仙景区)
 Jiafengshan Scenic Area (尖峰山景区)
 Dapantian Scenic Area (大盘天景区)
 Jiayuanli Scenic Area (家园里景区)
 Chisongshan Scenic Area (赤松山景区)

References

External links
 Photo gallery of Shuanglong Cave

See also
 Binghu Cave

Caves of Zhejiang
Karst caves
Karst formations of China
Show caves in China
Tourist attractions in Zhejiang
AAAA-rated tourist attractions